The 41st annual Berlin International Film Festival was held from 15 to 26 February 1991. The festival opened with Uranus by Claude Berri. The Golden Bear was awarded to Italian film La casa del sorriso directed by Marco Ferreri. The retrospective dedicated to Cold War films was shown at the festival.

Jury

The following people were announced as being on the jury for the festival:
 Volker Schlöndorff, director, screenwriter and producer (Germany) - Jury President
 Chantal Akerman, director, screenwriter and actress (Belgium)
 Laurie Anderson, musician and writer (United States)
 José Luis Borau, director and screenwriter (Spain)
 Judith Godrèche, actress and writer (France)
 Yuri Klepikov, writer (Soviet Union)
 Renate Krößner, actress (Germany)
 Gillo Pontecorvo, director and screenwriter (Italy)
 Simon Relph, producer (United Kingdom)
 Catharina Stackelberg, screenwriter (Sweden)
 Mircea Veroiu, director and screenwriter (Romania)

Films in competition
The following films were in competition for the Golden Bear and Silver Bear awards:

Key
{| class="wikitable" width="550" colspan="1"
| style="background:#FFDEAD;" align="center"| †
|Winner of the main award for best film in its section
|-
| colspan="2"| The opening and closing films are screened during the opening and closing ceremonies respectively.
|}

Retrospective

The following films were shown in the retrospective:

Awards

The following prizes were awarded by the Jury:
 Golden Bear: La casa del sorriso by Marco Ferreri
 Silver Bear – Special Jury Prize:
 La condanna by Marco Bellocchio
 Satan by Viktor Aristov
 Silver Bear for Best Director: 
 Jonathan Demme for The Silence of the Lambs
 Ricky Tognazzi for Ultrà
 Silver Bear for Best Actress: Victoria Abril for Amantes
 Silver Bear for Best Actor: Maynard Eziashi for Mister Johnson
 Silver Bear for an outstanding single achievement: Kevin Costner for Dances with Wolves
 Honourable Mention
 Dandan-e-mar
 Le Petit criminel
 Li Lianying: The Imperial Eunuch
FIPRESCI Award
Le Petit criminel by Jacques Doillon

References

External links
41st Berlin International Film Festival 1991
1991 Berlin International Film Festival
Berlin International Film Festival:1991 at Internet Movie Database

41
1991 film festivals
1991 in Berlin
Berl
Berlin